HD 72561 is a star in the constellation Hydra. Its apparent magnitude is 5.867. Based on parallax shift, it is located about 1,600 light-years (500 parsecs) away.

HD 72561 is a G-type giant star. It is over 4 times as massive as the Sun and 48 times as wide. It is about 150 million years old.

References

Notes

Hydra (constellation)
G-type giants
Durchmusterung objects
072561
3378
Hydrae, 32
042008